Doug Flach and Sandon Stolle were the defending champions, but competed this year with different partners. Flach teamed up with Mark Merklein and lost in the first round to David DiLucia and Laurence Tieleman, while Stolle teamed up with Max Mirnyi and lost in the first round to Wayne Ferreira and Nenad Zimonjić.

Wayne Arthurs and Leander Paes won the title by defeating Sargis Sargsian and Chris Woodruff 6–7(6–8), 7–6(9–7), 6–3 in the final.

Seeds

Draw

Draw

References

External links
 Official results archive (ATP)
 Official results archive (ITF)

1999 Hall of Fame Tennis Championships